The Sanctity of Human Life Act
was a proposed piece of U.S. federal abortion legislation which would have conferred the status of full legal personhood on embryos beginning at fertilization or cloning. 

Its 64 cosponsors, all Republicans,  included Todd Akin, whose comments about rape and abortion caused political controversy later in 2012, and the 2012 Republican presidential running mate Paul Ryan.

It should not be confused with the "Sanctity of Life Act", which was a different bill introduced in its 2011 (112th Congress) version by Ron Paul with no cosponsors.

References 

United States proposed federal abortion legislation